Stoas University of Applied Sciences (Dutch: Stoas Hogeschool) is a Dutch vocational college with the head office in Ede.

Stoas University of Applied Sciences is training new teachers, trainers and consultants for agricultural and horticultural education in the Netherlands. This can be for the level Middelbaar Beroepsonderwijs (vocational education) or for college (secondary education) and adult education (Beroeps- en Volwasseneneducatie in Dutch). Since 2003 there is also an International course with a one-year curriculum.

External links 
  Official website

Vocational universities in the Netherlands
Agricultural universities and colleges in the Netherlands
Buildings and structures in Gelderland
Education in North Brabant
Ede, Netherlands
's-Hertogenbosch